Glassfish may refer to:

 Asiatic glassfish, marine fishes in the family Ambassidae
 GlassFish, a Jakarta EE (formerly Java EE) application server project